The Tobago Jazz Festival is a music festival held every summer at Plymouth in Trinidad and Tobago which according to the Tourism Minister attracted over 20,000 visitors to Tobago.

History
The Jazz Festival was first held in 2004 but it was postponed in 2009, as the 2008 show costed $50 million, but ticket sales only yielded $17 million. A new company sponsored the 2010 Jazz festival, which saw a line-up including Carlos Santana, Gloria Estefan, Celine Dion, Tina Turner and Neil Diamond

2017 Jazz festival
Notable performers include Grace Jones, Shabba Ranks, and D’Angelo. Additionally, for the first time, a film component was added to the Festival, in collaboration with the T&T Film Festival.

See also

List of jazz festivals
List of historic jazz festivals

References

Jazz festivals in the Caribbean
Annual events in Trinidad and Tobago
Music festivals in Trinidad and Tobago
2000s establishments in Trinidad and Tobago
Music festivals established in 2004
Summer events in Trinidad and Tobago